Cissus sterculiifolia, the Yaroong is a widespread vine, though not particularly common. Found in rainforests north of Jervis Bay to Queensland in eastern Australia.

References 

sterculiifolia
Rosids of Australia
Flora of New South Wales
Flora of Queensland
Vines